In the City Without Limits is a 2002 Spanish-Argentine thriller drama film directed by Antonio Hernández and starring Leonardo Sbaraglia, Fernando Fernán Gómez and Geraldine Chaplin.

The film received five nominations to the 17th Goya Awards, winning Best Original Screenplay and Best Supporting Actress (Chaplin).

Synopsis 
A young man, Victor, arrives in Paris where his family have gathered around his seriously ill father Max, a former mogul now deteriorating physically and mentally. Max begins to behave very strangely, as his memories and those of Spain's past begin to cloud his mind. He becomes terrified of the staff taking care of him and tries to escape from the clinic in order to find a man named Rancel. The rest of his family assume Max is mad and quickly begin to squabble of dividing up his inheritance, but Victor becomes convinced that his father is being troubled by real events, and is resolved to find out why.

Cast

Release 
The film premiered at the 52nd Berlin International Film Festival on 12 February 2002 and was released theatrically in Spain on 1 March that year.

See also 
 List of Spanish films of 2002
 List of Argentine films of 2003

References

External links 
 

2002 films
Spanish thriller films
Argentine thriller films
2000s Spanish-language films
Films featuring a Best Supporting Actress Goya Award-winning performance
2000s thriller films
Films distributed by Disney
2000s Argentine films
2000s Spanish films
Films set in Paris